In Buddhism, the Sakadāgāmin (Pali; Sanskrit: Sakṛdāgāmin), "returning once" or "once-returner," is a partially enlightened person, who has cut off the first three chains with which the ordinary mind is bound, and significantly weakened the fourth and fifth. Sakadagaminship is the second stage of the four stages of enlightenment.

The Sakadagami will be reborn into the realm of the senses at most once more. If, however, they attain the next stage of enlightenment (Anagamiship) in this life, they will not come back to this world.

The three specific chains or fetters of which the Sakadagamin is free are:
1.  (Pali) - Belief in self (ātman)
2. Sīlabbata-parāmāsa (Pali) - Attachment to rites and rituals
3. Vicikicchā (Pali) - Skeptical doubtThe Sakadagami also significantly weakened the chains of:
4. Kāma-rāga (Pali) - Sensuous craving
5. Byāpāda (Pali) - Ill-will

Thus, the Sakadagamin is an intermediate stage between the Sotapanna, who still has comparatively strong sensuous desire and ill-will, and the Anagami, who is completely free from sensuous desire and ill-will. A Sakadagami's mind is very pure. Thoughts connected with greed, hatred and delusion do not arise often, and when they do, do not become obsessive.

See also
 Four stages of enlightenment
 Fetters (Buddhism)

Notes

Sources
 Rhys Davids, T.W. & William Stede (eds.) (1921-5). The Pali Text Society’s Pali–English Dictionary. Chipstead: Pali Text Society. A general on-line search engine for the PED is available at http://dsal.uchicago.edu/dictionaries/pali/.

Buddhist titles
Buddhist stages of enlightenment